Anchiopsis is a genus of trilobite in the order Phacopida, which existed in what is now New York, U.S.A. It was described by Delo in 1935, and the type species is Anchiopsis anchiops, which was originally described as Calymene anchiops by Green in 1832.

Distribution 
Fossils of Anchiopsis have been found in Canada (Ontario), Colombia (Floresta Formation, Floresta, Boyacá), and the United States (Indiana and New York).

References

Bibliography

External links 
 Anchiopsis in the Paleobiology Database

Dalmanitidae
Trilobites of North America
Devonian Canada
Devonian United States
Devonian trilobites of South America
Devonian Colombia
Fossils of Colombia
Fossil taxa described in 1935
Floresta Formation
Paleozoic life of Quebec